z/VM is the current version in IBM's VM family of virtual machine operating systems. z/VM was first released in October 2000 and remains in active use and development . It is directly based on technology and concepts dating back to the 1960s, with IBM's CP/CMS on the IBM System/360-67 (see article History of CP/CMS for historical details). z/VM runs on IBM's IBM Z family of computers. It can be used to support large numbers (thousands) of Linux virtual machines. (See Linux on IBM Z.)

On 16 September 2022, IBM released z/VM Version 7.3 which requires z/Architecture, implemented in IBM's EC12, BC12 and later models.

See also
 OpenSolaris for System z
 PR/SM
 Time-sharing system evolution
 z/OS
 z/TPF
 z/VSE

References

Citations

External links
 
 IBM z/VM Evaluation Edition (free download)

Virtualization software
IBM mainframe operating systems